The 8th Golden Raspberry Awards were held on April 10, 1988, at the Hollywood Roosevelt Hotel to recognize the worst the film industry had to offer in 1987. Leonard Part 6 was the biggest "winner" with three awards out of five nominations. Although he did not attend the ceremony, actor/producer/co-writer Bill Cosby later accepted all his awards on The Late Show.

Awards and nominations

Films with multiple nominations 
These films garnered multiple nominations:

See also

 1987 in film
 60th Academy Awards
 41st British Academy Film Awards
 45th Golden Globe Awards

References

External links
 Official summary of awards
 Nomination and award listing at the Internet Movie Database

Golden Raspberry Awards
08
1987 in American cinema
1988 in California
April 1988 events in the United States
Golden Raspberry